Camelot is a musical with music by Frederick Loewe and lyrics and a book by Alan Jay Lerner. It is based on the legend of King Arthur as adapted from the 1958 novel The Once and Future King by T. H. White.

The original production, directed by Moss Hart with orchestrations by Robert Russell Bennett and Philip J. Lang, ran on Broadway for 873 performances, winning four Tony Awards. It starred Richard Burton as Arthur, Julie Andrews as Guenevere, and Robert Goulet as Lancelot. It spawned several revivals, foreign productions, and a 1967 film adaptation. The musical has become associated with the Kennedy Administration, which is sometimes called the "Camelot Era", due to an interview with Jackie Kennedy in which she compared her husband's presidency to King Arthur's reign, specifically mentioning his fondness for the musical and particularly the closing lyrics which end the song "Camelot" and also form the ending of the musical itself.

A 2023 Broadway revival will feature a revised book by Aaron Sorkin.

Background

In 1959, Alan Jay Lerner and Moss Hart decided to adapt T. H. White's The Once and Future King as their next project. As discussed in Lerner's 1978 book, The Street Where I Live, Frederick Loewe, who initially had no interest in the project, agreed to write music, with the understanding that if things went badly, it would be his last score. After the tremendous success of My Fair Lady, expectations were high for a new Lerner and Loewe musical. However, the show's production met several obstacles. Lerner's wife left him during the writing process, causing him to seek medical attention and delaying the production.

When Camelot began rehearsals, it still needed considerable work. However, the producers were able to secure a strong cast, including Julie Andrews, Richard Burton, and Roddy McDowall, as well as Robert Goulet in his first Broadway role. John Cullum also made his Broadway debut as Sir Dinadan; Bruce Yarnell was Sir Lionel. Cullum later replaced McDowall, and William Squire replaced Burton. Other replacements included Patricia Bredin (as of April 16, 1962), Kathryn Grayson (as of October 23, 1962) and Janet Pavek (as of July 9, 1962) for Andrews.

Tryouts and promotion

The show premiered in Toronto, at the O'Keefe Centre on October 1, 1960. It overran drastically — it was supposed to last two hours forty minutes, and instead clocked in at four and a half hours.  The curtain came down at twenty minutes to one in the morning; Lerner later noted that "Only Tristan and Isolde equaled it as a bladder endurance contest." Noël Coward is supposed to have remarked that the show was "longer than the Götterdämmerung ... and not nearly as funny!" In spite of this, the morning papers gave generally positive reviews, but hinted that the show needed much work, i.e., drastic editing, in order to succeed. Soon afterwards, Lerner was hospitalized for three weeks with a bleeding ulcer.  Soon after he was discharged, Hart suffered his second heart attack, and Lerner stepped in as temporary director for the rest of the out-of-town run. Camelot then moved to Boston, edited, but still running well over the intended length. The production team tried to find another director, even phoning José Ferrer, who could not undertake the job. Lerner and Loewe disagreed on how to proceed with the show, as Loewe did not want to make any major changes without Hart's guidance. Lerner wrote: "God knows what would have happened had it not been for Richard Burton." Accepting cuts and changes, he radiated a "faith and geniality" and calmed the fears of the cast. Guenevere's song "Before I Gaze at You Again" was given to Andrews at the last minute before the first New York preview, which provoked her famous quote, "Of course, darling, but do try to get it to me the night before." After the show opened on Broadway, Hart was released from the hospital, and he and Lerner began cutting the play even further. Two songs, "Then You May Take Me To the Fair" and "Fie on Goodness," were cut a few months into the run (though they remain on the cast album, and the former featured in the 1967 film).

The New York critics' reviews of the original production were mixed. However, Ed Sullivan approached Lerner and Loewe to create a segment for his television variety program, celebrating the fifth anniversary of My Fair Lady. They decided to do very little from their previous hit and instead to perform four highlights from Camelot. The show stimulated ticket sales, and Camelot achieved an unprecedented advance sale of three and a half million dollars. Robert Goulet received favorable reviews, most notably for his rendition of the show-stopping romantic ballad "If Ever I Would Leave You", which became his signature song.

Aftermath
After Camelots run, Goulet appeared on The Danny Thomas Show and The Ed Sullivan Show, which made him a household name among American audiences.

A week after the assassination of U.S. President John F. Kennedy in November 1963, Kennedy's widow, Jackie Kennedy, was interviewed by Theodore H. White, an interview that ran in the December 1963 issue of Life magazine. In the interview, Jackie stated that the show's original cast recording had been a favorite bedtime listening for her husband (who had been Lerner's classmate at Harvard University), and that his favorite lines were in the final number: "Don't let it be forgot/ That once there was a spot/ For one brief, shining moment/ That was known as Camelot". She also made a direct comparison to the Camelot storyline, saying, "There'll be great presidents again... but there'll never be another Camelot." The veracity of her claim about her husband's love of Camelot has been disputed. Nevertheless, an association between Camelot and Kennedy's tenure as president formed immediately in the public consciousness, and has remained in the decades since.Frezza, Christine."'Camelot': One Brief Shining Moment" bard.org (Insights), 2005, accessed August 20, 2011 Lerner later wrote in his autobiography that, soon after the article came out, a touring production of the show at the Civic Opera House in Chicago had to be stopped after those lines were sung: "there was a sudden wail from the audience. It was not a muffled sob; it was a loud, almost primitive cry of pain. The play stopped, and for almost five minutes everyone in the theater - on the stage, in the wings, in the pit, and in the audience - wept without restraint. Then the play continued..."

The obstacles encountered in producing Camelot were hard on the creative partnership of Lerner and Loewe, and the show turned out to be one of their last collaborations (although they did work together to adapt their 1958 movie Gigi to the stage in 1973, and collaborated again the following year on the movie musical The Little Prince). Camelot was Hart's last Broadway show. He died of a heart attack in Palm Springs, California, on December 20, 1961.

Synopsis

The action starts at the end; Arthur demands that Merlin take him back to the beginning...

Act I
King Arthur is nervous about his upcoming arranged marriage and is hiding in a tree. Merlin the Magician, his wise tutor, calls Arthur down to warn the young king that he must learn to think for himself. Merlin, who lives backward in time and remembers the future as well as the past, knows he will soon be separated from Arthur. Merlin persuades Arthur to climb down and chides him for his unkingly behavior. Arthur then left alone, ponders both his subjects and his own feelings about the intended nuptials ("I Wonder What the King is Doing Tonight?"). Arthur hears someone coming and scampers up the tree again. Guenevere, Arthur's intended bride, comes to the woods. She does not like the idea of being Queen, preferring to live an ordinary life- at least, an ordinary rich life- ("Simple Joys of Maidenhood"). She stumbles into Arthur, who initially calls himself "Wart" (his childhood nickname), and then, hearing of her reluctance to marry, tells her of the joys of life in Camelot ("Camelot"). It is love at first sight, and they almost kiss but are interrupted when Arthur's attendants come upon the two of them. He is revealed as the King. He tells Guenevere the story of how he pulled the sword from the stone and became king, and she finally agrees to marry him. The wizard Merlin is amused by this development, but his joy turns to sorrow as his memories of the future begin to fade. He realizes that Nimue, a beautiful water nymph, has come to draw him into her cave for an eternal sleep ("Follow Me"). He begs Nimue for answers, as he has forgotten if he has warned Arthur about two important individuals, Lancelot and Mordred. His memories fade permanently, though, and he is led away.

Five years later, Arthur sits with Guenevere in his study, debating about what to do. He explains that he wishes to create a new kind of knight — one that does not pillage and fight but tries to uphold honor and justice. He is eventually inspired, with Guenevere's help, to establish the Round Table with the motto "might for right." Within a few months,  Arthur's idea leads to the Knights of the Round Table being renowned all over England, and their fame  even spreads to France. A young, pretentious and over-religious Frenchman from Joyous Garde named Lancelot du Lac has heard of the Round Table and is determined to come to Camelot and join Arthur's knights, confident that he is perfect for the post ("C'est Moi"). King Pellinore, an elderly man who was a friend of Arthur's family, also comes to Camelot to witness Arthur's greatness for himself.  He inadvertently wanders into the May Day festivities organized by Guenevere ("The Lusty Month of May").  On learning who he is, Guenevere orders a guestroom to be prepared, and has one of the knights escort him to the castle.  Pellinore becomes part of the family- he is still present at the play's conclusion, many years later. As Pellinore departs, King Arthur arrives with Lancelot, and introduces him to the company.  Guenevere is put off by Lancelot's boastful manner and her attempts to draw him into conversation seem only intended to prove him wrong about his apparently unrealistic claims about his own prowess. The knights and ladies of the court watch in amusement. Guenevere incites three of the knights — Sir Dinadan, Sir Sagramore and the burly Sir Lionel — to challenge Lancelot to a joust ("Then You May Take Me to the Fair"). Arthur (who, unlike everybody else, is friendly with Lancelot) is dismayed by this, and is at a loss to understand a woman's ways — though he cannot be angry with Guenevere ("How to Handle a Woman").

In the jousting match Lancelot easily defeats all three knights. He wounds Sir Lionel, who fights him last, so badly that the crowd thinks he is dead. But the dismay of the crowd turns to awe as Lancelot's distraught cries for Sir Lionel to live seemingly resurrect a dead man. Whether the miracle is actual or not, all the court believes in it and all the knights and ladies bow or curtsey to Lancelot to do homage to him as he passes by. Guenevere also curtsies to him, he kneels before her, their eyes lock and they seem to both see something in one another's eyes that neither saw there before. Arthur sees them seeing one another. In the scenes that follow, Guenevere is torn between her new love for Lancelot and her love and loyalty for Arthur, and wishes Lancelot would leave Camelot ("Before I Gaze at You Again"). By some unfortunate twist of fate, Lancelot, in spite of his boasts that he is immune to pleasures of the flesh, is also madly in love with Guenevere and is similarly torn by the conflict between this love and his devotion to Arthur. Arthur makes Lancelot a Knight of the Round Table. As it happens, the shrewd King Arthur guesses that Lancelot and Guenevere have feelings for each other, but hopes it will blow over, as he does not wish to upset the tranquility of Camelot. He soliloquizes to his sword Excalibur, that they will rise to the challenges they will all face, together.

Act II
Many years later, Guenevere and Lancelot are still tormented by their unfulfilled love. She tries to get rid of him, but Lancelot will not leave her ("If Ever I Would Leave You"). They both believe that Arthur is not aware of it. Nevertheless, she remains faithful to Arthur, and helps him in carrying out the affairs of State.

Mordred, Arthur's illegitimate son, comes to Camelot to dishonor the King and tries to gain the throne for himself. Arthur puts him in charge of the knights’ training program, not knowing that Mordred is there to destroy the Round Table in revenge against Arthur for abandoning him, and detests the idea of being a Knight ("The Seven Deadly Virtues"). Arthur begins to feel the strain of ruling England, and both he and Guenevere wonder what commoners do without any such responsibilities ("What Do The Simple Folk Do?"). 

Mordred, meanwhile, has devised a plan to ruin Arthur and his kingdom permanently. He enters an enchanted glade where his aunt, the sorceress Morgan le Fay, dwells in an invisible castle. Morgan has a sweet tooth, and though she likes Arthur, Mordred manages to bribe her with a large supply of sweetmeats, to build one of her invisible walls around Arthur for one night, so that when he goes on his hunting trip the next day, he will not be able to get back to the castle ("The Persuasion").  Meanwhile, Mordred incites the Knights to remember their former days of fighting and pillaging and turns them against Arthur ("Fie On Goodness!").  

With Arthur gone, Lancelot, unable to stop himself, visits Guenevere in her chambers, as Mordred fully suspected he would.  They kiss passionately ("I Loved You Once in Silence"). However, Lancelot and Guenevere affair and Mordred's machinations come to a head when Mordred and some of the Knights of the Round Table interrupt, accuse Lancelot of treason, and try to take him prisoner. Lancelot fights them off and escapes, but Guenevere is arrested, tried, found guilty of treason by reason of her infidelity, and sentenced to be burned at the stake ("Guenevere"). At the execution, Arthur watches from a distance as Mordred taunts him for his failures; he is torn between upholding his law and doing his duty as a king, or sparing Guenevere, whom he still loves in spite of everything. At the last moment, Lancelot arrives with an army, rescues Guenevere and takes her off with him to France. But in the process, Lancelot has been forced to kill some of the other knights, leaving the survivors vowing revenge.

For the sake of his own honor and that of Camelot, Arthur must now wage war against Lancelot. Mordred has taken up his own army against Arthur, back in England. The war takes a terrible toll on Camelot, as more than half of the Knights of the Round Table are killed. Before the final battle, Arthur meets Lancelot and Guenevere. Lancelot and Guenevere's relationship has floundered, doubtless because of their guilty consciences. Guenevere has become a nun, and the Round Table is now broken. They offer to face up to justice in England, but Arthur will not see Guenevere burned or Lancelot beheaded. He forgives them both, and they depart separately. That night in camp, Arthur meets a young stowaway named Tom of Warwick (likely Sir Thomas Malory), who has come to join the Round Table. His speech reminds Arthur of the idealism and hope that he had as a young king, and inspires him. Arthur knights Tom, and sends him back to England to grow up there, that he might pass on to future generations the ideals of chivalry and Camelot ("Camelot" (reprise)).

Productions and adaptations

Original production and tours
Camelot opened on Broadway at the Majestic Theatre on December 3, 1960, and closed on January 5, 1963, after 873 performances and 2 previews. Directed by Moss Hart, the choreography was by Hanya Holm, scenic design by Oliver Smith, costume design by Adrian (who worked on the designs prior to his death in September 1959) and Tony Duquette, and lighting design by Abe Feder.  It won four Tony Awards. The original cast album was America's top-selling mono LP record for 6 weeks.

A two-year U.S. tour followed the Broadway closing, starring Kathryn Grayson and William Squire, who was succeeded by Louis Hayward. Grayson was dismissed in Cincinnati, OH, for having missed performances and replaced by her understudy, Jan Moody. There was also a 1963–1964 bus-and-truck tour starring Biff McGuire as Arthur, Jeannie Carson as Guenevere, and Sean Garrison as Lancelot. Yet another company toured with the show in 1964, starring Howard Keel as Arthur, Constance Towers as Guenevere, and Bob Holiday as Lancelot. Also in 1964 an Australian production opened at  Her Majesty's Theatre, Melbourne, starring Paul Daneman and Jacqueline McKeever, with stage design by John Truscott. Truscott would later work on the film adaptation. The production, by the J. C. Williamson company, ran for two years.

Original London production
The London production opened in August 1964 at the Theatre Royal, Drury Lane, and featured Laurence Harvey as Arthur, Elizabeth Larner as Guenevere and Barry Kent as Lancelot. It played for 518 performances.

Film adaptation
The film version, directed by Joshua Logan, was released in 1967, starring Richard Harris as Arthur, Vanessa Redgrave as Guenevere, Franco Nero as Lancelot and David Hemmings as Mordred.

Subsequent productions
 Richard Burton reprised his role as Arthur in a revival that ran from July 8, 1980, to August 23, 1980, at the New York State Theater at Lincoln Center for the Performing Arts. Christine Ebersole played Guenevere, and Richard Muenz was Lancelot.
 The show was revived on Broadway at the Winter Garden Theatre from November 15, 1981, to January 2, 1982, and was broadcast on HBO a year later, starring Richard Harris as Arthur, Meg Bussert as Guenevere,  Muenz as Lancelot and Thor Fields as Tom of Warwick. Harris, who had starred in the film, and Muenz also took the show on tour nationwide.   
 Richard Harris again played Arthur in a West End revival at the Apollo Victoria Theatre, London, from November 23, 1982 to February 5, 1983 with Fiona Fullerton, William Squire and Robert Meadmore.
 Another Broadway revival ran from June 21, 1993 to August 7, 1993 for 56 performances at the Gershwin Theatre, with Robert Goulet now cast in the role of Arthur. Goulet reprised this role at Toronto's O'Keefe Centre in 1993.
 An 18-month U.S. tour, starring Michael York as Arthur, Rachel York (no relation) as Guenevere, and James Barbour as Lancelot, began on January 9, 2007 and ended in April 2008. Alan Jay Lerner's son, Michael Lerner, contributed changes to the libretto, and Glenn Casale directed. From June 27–30, 2007, the tour played at Toronto's Hummingbird Centre, where the musical had premiered in 1960.Camelot Canadian listing in the Sonycentre newsletter sonycentre.ca, June 2007 While the 2007 Michael York tour was performing across the U.S., Candlewood International ran a separate, largely non-equity national tour that played to cities not visited by the union tour. The Morgan le Fay character was removed, as it had been in all previous productions since 1964. Jeff Buchsbaum directed and Paula Sloan choreographed a cast headed by Robert Brown as Arthur, Matthew Posner as Lancelot, Mollie Vogt-Welch as Guenevere, Gregory Van Acker as Sir Sagramore, Geoff Lutz as Mordred, and Heather Faith Stricker as Lady Catherine.
 From May 7 to May 10, 2008, the New York Philharmonic presented five semi-staged concerts of Camelot directed by Lonny Price and produced by Thomas Z. Shepard and starring Gabriel Byrne as King Arthur, Marin Mazzie as Guenevere, and Nathan Gunn as Lancelot. It featured Christopher Lloyd as Pellinore, Stacy Keach as Merlyn, Marc Kudisch as Lionel, Bobby Steggert as Mordred, Will Swenson as Sagramore, Christopher Sieber as Dinadan, Fran Drescher as Morgan le Fay and Rishi Mutalik as Tom of Warwick. The May 8 performance was broadcast nationally on Live from Lincoln Center on PBS.
 Camelot was produced in San Francisco at San Francisco Playhouse in July 2013.
 The 2018 production at Sidney Harman Hall set box office records for the Shakespeare Theatre Company in Washington, DC.
In 2019, there was a Lincoln Center Theater gala production of Camelot starring Lin Manuel Miranda and Jordan Donica as Arthur and Lancelot respectively.
  A semi-staged concert performance of the musical ran at the Watermill Theatre, Newbury from 17th of August to the 5th of September 2020. Due to the COVID-19 pandemic, the concerts were held outdoors in the theatre's gardens and the audience were seated at socially distanced tables. It was directed by The Watermill Theatre's Artistic Director Paul Hart. The cast included real life  married couple Michael Jibson & Caroline Sheen as Arthur and Guenevere, Marc Antolin as Lancelot and Peter Dukes as Mordred.
 In March 2022, it was reported that Aaron Sorkin and Bartlett Sher are working on a reimagined production for Broadway, which is slated to begin performances on Thursday, November 3 and open on Thursday, December 8 at the Vivian Beaumont Theater. In June 2022, it was announced that the revival had been postponed to the spring of 2023. It began previews on March 9, 2023, with an official opening scheduled for Thursday, April 13, 2023. Cast members include Andrew Burnap as Arthur, Phillipa Soo as Guenevere, and Jordan Donica as Lancelot.

Critical assessments
The New York critics' reviews of the original production were mixed to positive. A 1993 review in The New York Times commented that the musical "has grown in stature over the years, primarily because of its superb score ... [which] combined a lyrical simplicity with a lush romanticism, beautifully captured in numbers like 'I Loved You Once in Silence' and 'If Ever I Would Leave You.' These ballads sung by Guenevere and Lancelot are among the most memorable in the Lerner-Loewe catalogue. King Arthur supplies the wit, with songs like 'I Wonder What the King Is Doing Tonight.'" A 2003 review noted, "this musically rich, legend-based classic evokes enough swashbuckling spectacle to keep one smiling. And for lovers of dime-store romance, Camelot has it all — a beautiful English princess swept off her feet by a shy, but passionate bachelor king; an ardent French knight, torn between devotion to his liege and an uncontrollable hunger, reciprocated, to be sure, for the king's tempestuous wife.... Camelot features a score rich in English country-tune charm by Mr. Lerner. [sic: Loewe wrote the music] Its lyrics, by Mr. Loewe [sic: Lerner wrote the lyrics], never fail to dazzle with their virtuosity and wit." However, "Jay Lerner's murky book... has helped sink many a revival of the musical.... It's a good story, but Lerner's book is talky and dense, filled with pontificating soliloquies that would have been more powerfully contained in song. Moreover, while the entire show rushes towards a bloody climax... when it finally arrives, it is merely sketched upon in one song, 'Guenevere.' ...The score, though, is pure magic."

Roles and original cast

The original Broadway production featured the following cast:" 'Camelot' 1960" ibdb.com, retrieved December 1, 2017
 King Arthur — Richard Burton
 Queen Guenevere — Julie Andrews
 Sir Lancelot — Robert Goulet
 Merlin — David Hurst
 Pellinore — Robert Coote
 Mordred — Roddy McDowall
 Sir Dinadan — John Cullum
 Morgan le Fay — M'el Dowd*
 Tom of Warwick — Robin Stewart
 Lady Catherine — Virginia Allen
 Nimue — Marjorie Smith
 Sir Lionel — Bruce Yarnell
 Sir Ozanna — Michael Kermoyan
 Sir Sagramore — James E. Gannon
* In subsequent productions Alan Jay Lerner removed the "Morgan le Fay" role to make the second act less comical, replacing the scene between her and Mordred with a Mordred/Arthur scene.

 Additional Performers King Arthur: Andrew Burnap, Robert Cuccioli, Robert Goulet, Jeremy Irons, Ramin Karimloo, Terrence Mann, Lin-Manuel Miranda, David ThaxtonGuenevere: Kim Crosby, Melissa Errico, Betsy Joslyn, Phillipa Soo, Lucy St. Louis, Linda BenantiLancelot:''' James Barbour, Steve Blanchard, Robert Cuccioli, Jordan Donica, Gregg Edelman, Bradley Jaden, Chuck Wagner

Musical numbers

Act I
 "Overture"
 "The March [Parade]" — Instrumental
 "I Wonder What the King Is Doing Tonight" — Arthur
 "The Simple Joys of Maidenhood" — Guenevere
 "Camelot" — Arthur
 "Camelot" (reprise) — Arthur, Guenevere
 "Follow Me" — Nimue
 "C'est Moi" — Lancelot
 "The Lusty Month of May" — Guenevere, Ensemble
 "Then You May Take Me to the Fair"§ — Guenevere, Sir Lionel, Sir Sagramore, Sir Dinaden
 "How To Handle a Woman" — Arthur
 "The Jousts" — Arthur, Guenevere, Ensemble
 "Before I Gaze at You Again" — Guenevere

Act II
 "If Ever I Would Leave You" — Lancelot
 "The Seven Deadly Virtues" — Mordred
 "What Do the Simple Folk Do?" — Arthur and Guenevere
 "Fie on Goodness!"§ — Mordred & Knights
 "I Loved You Once In Silence" — Guenevere
 "Guenevere" — Ensemble
 "Camelot" (reprise) — King Arthur

§ — Cut shortly into the original 1960 run, remained on the cast album; restored in most subsequent revivals; "Fie on Goodness" cut from film version; "Then You May Take Me to the Fair" included in film.

Awards and nominations

Original Broadway production

1980 Broadway revival
Source: IBDB

Original cast recording

References

Sources
 Lerner, Alan Jay. The Street Where I Live (1978). W. W. Norton & Company, 
 Kantor, Michael and Maslon, Laurence. Broadway: The American Musical'' (2004). Bluefinch Press, New York,

External links

 
 Summary, production, and licensing information at Tams-Witmark
 Camelot Audition Advice and Show Information from MusicalTheatreAudition.net
 Background of the show and commentary by Judy Harris
 Study Guide, Bard College 
 Information about the show theatrehistory.com
 Information about recordings, Cast Albumdb.com
New York Public Library Blog about Camelot

1960 musicals
Arthurian musical theatre
Broadway musicals
Musicals based on secular traditions
Musicals based on novels
Fantasy theatre
Musicals by Alan Jay Lerner
Musicals by Frederick Loewe
Tony Award-winning musicals
Works set in castles